Déjà vu is a French phrase meaning "already seen", and it refers to the experience of feeling sure that one has witnessed or experienced a new situation previously.

Déjà Vu may also refer to:

Music
 Deja Vu, a 1980s Japanese progressive rock band formed by Motoi Sakuraba

Albums
 Deià...Vu, by Kevin Ayers, 1984
 Déjà vu (Blue System album) or the title song (see below), 1991
 Déjà Vu (CNCO album), 2021
 Déjà Vu (Crosby, Stills, Nash & Young album) or the title song, 1970
 Déjà Vu (Giorgio Moroder album) or the title song (see below), 2015
 Déjà-vu (Hitomi album) or the title song, 1997
 Dejavu (Koda Kumi album), 2011
 Déjà-Vu (Metrô album) or the title song, 2002
 Déjà-Vu (Will album), 2000
 Deja Vu, by Mike Singer, or the title song, 2018
 Deja Vu, by Willie Colón, 1978

EPs
 Déjà Vu (SS501 EP) or the title song, 2006
 Deja Vu, by Sonamoo, or the title song, 2014

Songs
 "Déjà Vu" (3OH!3 song), 2010
 "Deja Vu" (A.B.'s song), 1984
 "Déjà Vu" (Beyoncé song), 2006
 "Déjà vu" (Blue System song), 1991
 "Déjà Vu" (Bob Taylor and Inna song), 2009
 "Déjà Vu" (Dionne Warwick song), 1979
 "Déjà Vu" (Giorgio Moroder song), 2015
 "Deja Vu" (J. Cole song), 2016
 "Deja Vu" (Olivia Rodrigo song), 2021
 "Deja Vu" (Post Malone song), 2016
 "Deja Vu" (Prince Royce and Shakira song), 2017
 "Déjà Vu" (Roger Waters song), 2017
 "Déjà Vu" (Something for Kate song), 2003
 "Deja Vu (All Over Again)", by John Fogerty, 2004
 "Deja Vu (Uptown Baby)", by Lord Tariq and Peter Gunz, 1997
 "Deja Vu", by Ateez from Zero: Fever Part.3, 2021
 "Déjà Vu", by Avril Lavigne from Love Sux, 2022
 "Déjà Vu", by Bear Hands from You'll Pay for This, 2016
 "Déjà Vu", by the Bee Gees from This Is Where I Came In, 2001
 "Déjà Vu", by Cibo Matto from Hotel Valentine, 2014
 "Deja Vu", by Dave Rodgers, 1999
 "Déjà Vu", by Dog Fashion Disco from Committed to a Bright Future, 2003
 "Deja Vu", by Dreamcatcher, 2019
 "Déjà Vu", by Eminem from Relapse, 2009
 "Deja Vu", by En Vogue from Electric Café, 2018
 "Déjà Vu", by Enigma from Seven Lives Many Faces, 2008
 "Deja Vu", by f(x) from 4 Walls, 2015
 "Déjà Vu", by Iron Maiden from Somewhere in Time, 1986
 "Deja Vu", by James Arthur from It'll All Make Sense in the End, 2021
 "Déjà Vu", by Katy Perry from Witness, 2017
 "Deja Vu", by Killah Priest from Black August, 2003
 "Deja Vu", by Lauren Duski, performing on season 12 of The Voice (U.S.), 2017
 "Deja Vu", by Luna Sea from Image, 1992
 "Déjà Vu", by Mike Posner from 31 Minutes to Takeoff, 2010
 "Déjà Vu", by Pitty from Anacrônico, 2005
 "Deja Vu", by Roc Project, 2004
 "Déjà Vu", by Sleeping with Sirens from Feel, 2013
 "Déjà Vu", by Steve Hackett from Genesis Revisited, 1996
 "Deja-Vu", by T-ara from Treasure Box, 2013
 "Deja Vu", by Tainy and Yandel, 2021
 "Déjà Vu", by Twenty88 from Twenty88, 2016
 "Dejavu", by Twice from What Is Love?, 2018
 "Deja Vu", by Velvet from The Queen, 2008
 "Deja-vu", by Yeah Yeah Yeahs from Show Your Bones, 2006
 "Deja Vu", by Yngwie Malmsteen from Odyssey, 1988
 "Deja Vu", by Zion I from Enter the Woods, 1997
 "Déjà Vu (I've Been Here Before)", by Teena Marie from Wild and Peaceful, 1979
 "Take Me Back (Déjà Vu)", by Van Halen from Balance, 1995

Computing
 Déjà Vu (software), a program for computer-assisted translation
 Déjà Vu (video game), a 1985 adventure game for the Macintosh
 DejaVu fonts, a typeface family

Film
 Déjà Vu (1985 film), an American motion picture starring Jaclyn Smith
 Deja Vu (1990 film), a Soviet-Polish comedy film starring Jerzy Stuhr
 Déjà Vu (1997 film), an American film directed by Henry Jaglom 
 Déjà Vu (2006 film), an American science fiction action film starring Denzel Washington
 Déjà Vu (2015 film), a Chinese comedy film
 Deja Vu, a 2021 Indian Hindi-language film directed by Abhijeet Mohan Warang
 Dejavu (2022 film), an Indian Tamil-language mystery thriller film

Television
 Deja Vu (TV series), a Taiwan TV series
 "Deja Vu" (The Outer Limits), a 1999 episode of The Outer Limits
 "Deja-vu", a 2020 episode of Dark
 "Déjà Vu" (Code Lyoko episode)
 "Déjà Vu (or: Show 5)", an episode of Monty Python's Flying Circus

Plays
 Déjàvu, a 1992 stage play by John Osborne
 Déjà Vu, a 2009 radio play by Alexis Zegerman, directed by Lu Kemp

Other uses
 Déjà Vu (radio personality), radio personality and motivational speaker
 Déjà Vu (company), a U.S. company that owns strip clubs
 Déjà Vu, Giant Inverted Boomerang roller coasters by Vekoma
 Deja Vu All Over Again (disambiguation)

See also
 Deja (disambiguation)
 Deja Voodoo (disambiguation)
 Deja vous (disambiguation)
 DejaView, a Canadian television channel
 DjVu, a file format for storing images